Frederick McCarthy Forsyth  (born 25 August 1938) is an English novelist and journalist. He is best known for thrillers such as The Day of the Jackal, The Odessa File, The Fourth Protocol, The Dogs of War, The Devil's Alternative, The Fist of God, Icon, The Veteran, Avenger, The Afghan, The Cobra and The Kill List.

Forsyth's works frequently appear on best-sellers lists and more than a dozen of his titles have been adapted to film. By 2006, he had sold more than 70 million books in more than 30 languages.

Early life
The son of a furrier, Forsyth was born in Ashford, Kent. He was educated at Tonbridge School and later attended the University of Granada in Spain.

Career

Military and journalism
Before becoming a journalist, Forsyth completed his National Service in the Royal Air Force as a pilot, for which he flew the de Havilland Vampire. He joined Reuters in 1961 and in 1965 the BBC, for which he served as an assistant diplomatic correspondent.

Forsyth reported on his early activities as a journalist. His early career was spent covering French affairs and the attempted assassination of Charles de Gaulle. He had never been to Black Africa until reporting on the Nigerian Civil War between Biafra and Nigeria as a BBC correspondent.
He was there for the first six months of 1967, but few expected the war to last very long considering the poor weaponry and preparation of the Biafrans when compared to the British-armed Nigerians. After his six months were over, however, Forsyth — eager to carry on reporting — approached the BBC to ask if he could have more time there. He noted their response:

He thus returned to Biafra as a freelance reporter, writing his first book, The Biafra Story, in 1969.

In August 2015 Forsyth revealed that in Biafra he was an informant for MI6, a relationship that continued for 20 years. According to Forsyth, he was not paid.

He is an occasional radio broadcaster on political issues and has also written for newspapers throughout his career, including a weekly page in the Daily Express. In 2003, he criticised "gay-bashers in the churches" in The Guardian newspaper. He has narrated several documentaries, including Jesus Christ Airlines, Soldiers: A History of Men in Battle and I Have Never Forgotten You: The Life & Legacy of Simon Wiesenthal.

Writing
Forsyth decided to write a novel using similar research techniques to those used in journalism. His first full-length novel, The Day of the Jackal, was published in 1971. It became an international bestseller and gained its author the Edgar Allan Poe Award for Best Novel. In this book, the Organisation Armée Secrète hires an assassin to kill then–French President Charles de Gaulle. It was made into a film of the same name.

In Forsyth's second full-length novel, The Odessa File (1972), a reporter attempts to track down an ex-Nazi SS officer in contemporary Germany. The reporter discovers him via the diary of a Jewish Holocaust survivor who committed suicide earlier, but he is being shielded by an organization that protects ex-Nazis, called ODESSA. This book was later made into a movie with the same name, starring Jon Voight, but there were substantial alterations.  Many of the novel's readers assumed that ODESSA really existed, but historians disagree.

In The Dogs of War (1974) a British mining executive hires a group of mercenaries to overthrow the government of an African country so that he can install a puppet regime that will allow him cheap access to a colossal platinum-ore reserve. This book was also adapted into a 1980 film starring Christopher Walken and Tom Berenger.

The Shepherd was an illustrated novella published in 1975.  It tells of a nightmare journey by an RAF pilot while flying home for Christmas in the late 1950s. His attempts to find a rational explanation for his eventual rescue prove as troublesome as his experience.

Following this came The Devil's Alternative in 1979, which was set in 1982. In this book, the Soviet Union faces a disastrous grain harvest. The US is ready to help for some political and military concessions. A Politburo faction fight ensues. War is proposed as a solution. Ukrainian freedom fighters complicate the situation later. In the end, a Swedish oil tanker built in Japan, a Russian airliner hijacked to West Berlin and various governments find themselves involved.

In 1982, No Comebacks, a collection of ten short stories, was published. Some of these stories had been written earlier. Many were set in the Republic of Ireland where Forsyth was living at the time. One of them, There Are No Snakes in Ireland, won him a second Edgar Allan Poe Award, this time for best short story.

The Fourth Protocol was published in 1984 and involves renegade elements within the Soviet Union attempting to plant a nuclear bomb near an American airbase in the UK, intending to influence the upcoming British elections and lead to the election of an anti-NATO, anti-American, anti-nuclear, pro-soviet Labour government. The 1987 adaptation starred Pierce Brosnan and Michael Caine. Almost all of the political content was removed from the film.

Forsyth's tenth book came in 1989 with The Negotiator, in which the American President's son is kidnapped and one man's job is to negotiate his release.

Two years later, in 1991, The Deceiver was published. It includes four short stories reviewing the career of British secret agent Sam McCready. At the start of the novel, the Permanent Under-Secretary of State (PUSS) of the Foreign and Commonwealth Office requires the Chief of the SIS to push Sam into early retirement. The four stories are presented to a grievance committee in an attempt to allow Sam to stay on active duty with the SIS.

In 1994, Forsyth published The Fist of God, a novel which concerns the first Gulf War, Project Babylon and competition between Intelligence Agencies. Next, in 1996, he published Icon, about the rise of fascists to power in post-Soviet Russia.

In 1999, Forsyth published The Phantom of Manhattan, a sequel to The Phantom of the Opera. It was intended as a departure from his usual genre; Forsyth's explanation was that "I had done mercenaries, assassins, Nazis, murderers, terrorists, special forces soldiers, fighter pilots, you name it, and I got to think, could I actually write about the human heart?" However, it did not achieve the same success as his other novels, and he subsequently returned to modern-day thrillers.

In 2001, The Veteran, another collection of short stories, was published, followed by Avenger, published in September 2003, about a Canadian billionaire who hires a Vietnam veteran to bring his grandson's killer to the US. Avenger was released as a film starring Sam Elliott and Timothy Hutton.

The Afghan, published in August 2006, is an indirect sequel to The Fist of God. Set in the very near future, the threat of a catastrophic assault on the West, discovered on a senior al-Qaeda member's computer, compels the leaders of the US and the UK to attempt a desperate gambit — to substitute a seasoned British operative, retired Col. Mike Martin (of The Fist of God), for an Afghan Taliban commander being held prisoner at Guantánamo Bay.

The Cobra, published in 2010, features some of the characters previously featured in Avenger, and has as its subject an attempt to destroy the world trade in cocaine.

On 20 August 2013, his novel The Kill List was published. It was announced earlier in June that year that Rupert Sanders would be directing a film version of the story.

On 10 September 2015, Forsyth's autobiography, The Outsider: My Life in Intrigue, was published.

In January 2018 it was announced that Forsyth would publish his eighteenth novel, a thriller about computer hackers, inspired by the Lauri Love and Gary McKinnon stories. The Fox was published in electronic format in October 2018, and released in hardcover in November. The Fox is an espionage thriller about an autistic but gifted hacker.

Awards 
On 16 February 2012 the Crime Writers Association announced that Forsyth had won its Cartier Diamond Dagger award in recognition of his body of work.

Forsyth was appointed a Commander of the Order of the British Empire (CBE) in the 1997 New Year Honours list for services to literature.

Other appearances
In September 2005, Forsyth appeared on the ITV gameshow Who Wants To Be A Millionaire? and raised £250,000 for charity.  He offered the answer for the £500,000 question but, despite being correct, he decided to take £250,000. On 8 February 2007, Forsyth appeared on BBC's political panel show Question Time; on it, he expressed scepticism on the subject of anthropogenic climate change.  On 26 March 2008, he also appeared on BBC's The One Show. On 17 June 2008, Forsyth was interviewed on BBC Radio 5 Live Midday News in relation to the restoration of the Military Covenant. On 2 February 2015, he appeared on Eggheads as a member of Rewarding Talent.

Political views 
Forsyth is a Eurosceptic Conservative. He has been Patron of The People's Book Prize since 2010. He is Patron of Better Off Out, an organisation calling for Britain's withdrawal from the European Union, and he supports Brexit. In 2003, he was awarded the One of Us Award from the Conservative Way Forward group for his services to the Conservative movement in Britain. He is also a patron of the Young Britons' Foundation.

In 2005, he came out in opposition to Kenneth Clarke's candidacy for the leadership of the Conservative Party, calling Clarke's record in government "unrivalled; a record of failure which at every level has never been matched". Instead, he endorsed and donated money to David Davis's campaign. In the run-up to the 2005 United Kingdom general election, Forsyth called for the impeachment of Tony Blair over the 2003 invasion of Iraq and lent his support to anti-war campaigner Reg Keys who stood in Blair's constituency of Sedgefield.

Personal life 
Forsyth has been married twice, first to former model Carole Cunningham between 1973 and 1988, with whom he had two sons Stuart and Shane, and then to Sandy Molloy, since 1994. He also had a relationship with actress Faye Dunaway. Forsyth previously resided in a manor house in Hertfordshire with his family before moving to Buckinghamshire in 2010.

In 2016, he said he was giving up writing thrillers because his wife had told him he was too old to travel to dangerous places.

Bibliography 

The following four works listed above are not fictional novels or novellas: The Biafra Story (1969), Emeka (1982), Great Flying Stories (1991) and The Outsider (2015).

Filmography
As writer only (except for Soldiers, as presenter)

Film

Television

Theatre

Video

Video games

Music videos

Music
Forsyth wrote lyrics to a lament titled "Fallen Soldier", with music by Gareth Ellis Williams, which was released as a single by Royal Opera House soprano Melissa Alder in 2016.

See also 
 List of bestselling novels in the United States

References

External links 

 Frederick Forsyth official website
 
 .

 
1938 births
20th-century English novelists
20th-century Royal Air Force personnel
21st-century British novelists
British expatriates in Nigeria
Commanders of the Order of the British Empire
Conservative Party (UK) people
Edgar Award winners
English aviators
English spy fiction writers
English thriller writers
Living people
People educated at Tonbridge School
People from Ashford, Kent
Royal Air Force officers
University of Granada alumni
War correspondents of the Nigerian Civil War
Cartier Diamond Dagger winners